Madonna and Child is an oil on panel painting by Cima da Conegliano, created in 1495, now in the Pinacoteca Nazionale di Bologna. A studio copy also survives in the Holburne Museum in Bath, Somerset, United Kingdom.

References

Paintings in the collection of the Pinacoteca Nazionale di Bologna
1495 paintings
Bologna